The Sri Lanka national badminton team ( Shri Lanka Jathika Bædmintan Kandayama) represents Sri Lanka in international badminton team competitions. The team has had  many appearances in the Sudirman Cup with its latest in the 2019 edition, but has never been qualified to the Thomas Cup and the Uber Cup.

In the South Asian Games, the Sri Lanka team has made many final appearances in both men and women's team and have achieved runners-up after losing to India.

Participation in BWF competitions

Sudirman Cup

Participation in Badminton Asia Team Championships

Men's team

Women's team

Mixed team

Participation in South Asian Games 

Men's team

Women's team

Current squad 
The following players were selected to represent Sri Lanka at the 2019 South Asian Games.
Male players
Sachin Dias
Buwaneka Goonethilleka
Niluka Karunaratne
Lochana de Silva
Chirshan Danushka
Madhuka Dulanjana
Hasitha Chanaka
Dinuka Karunaratne
Ranthushka Sasindu

Female players
Thilini Hendahewa
Kavidi Sirimannage
Hasini Ambalangodage
Kavindika de Silva
Dilmi Dias
Achini Ratnasiri
Upuli Weerasinghe
Hasara Wijayarathne

References

Badminton
National badminton teams
Badminton in Sri Lanka